Dorking Deepdene railway station is a railway station in the town of Dorking, Surrey, England. The station is within walking distance of Dorking station and interchange on a through ticket is permitted.

Dorking Deepdene is managed by Great Western Railway, which also operates all services through the station.

The station has two platforms, each long enough to accommodate a four-carriage train. It is unstaffed and has no ticket office. Tickets can be bought on trains, at the automatic ticket machine at the entrance to the station, or at the ticket office at nearby Dorking station, which sells tickets for all National Rail services.

History
The Reading, Guildford and Reigate Railway (RG&RR) was authorised in 1846 and opened in stages.

A second station in Dorking (what is now Dorking Deepdene) was not built until 1 February 1851; when it opened, it was originally named "Box Hill and Leatherhead Road" and it was shortened to "Box Hill" in March the same year. The RG&RR was soon absorbed by the South Eastern Railway (SER).

The station at Box Hill was temporarily closed from 1 January 1917, and reopened on 1 January 1919. In the 1923 grouping the SER became part of the new Southern Railway, which on 9 June of that year renamed the station "Deepdene" to avoid confusion with  station. On 11 May 1987 British Railways renamed the station "Dorking (Deepdene)".

Services

Services to and from Gatwick call only at principal stations en route, while those to and from Redhill stop at most intermediate stations in both directions. Service frequency is reduced to hourly or two-hourly during the evenings.

Future proposals
In November 2018, a £21 million upgrade of Dorking Deepdene station was proposed by the Dorking Town Forum, who submitted a nomination for funding from Network Rail. The proposal includes:
 relocation of the platforms east of the current site (immediately west of the bridge over the Mole Valley line);
 construction of two new lifts, to allow step-free access to both platforms, and a pair of new waiting rooms;
 a direct foot link between Dorking Deepdene and  stations, by means of a new -long walkway constructed along the western edge of the Mole Valley line.

References

External links

Railway stations in Surrey
Dorking
Former South Eastern Railway (UK) stations
Railway stations in Great Britain opened in 1851
Railway stations in Great Britain closed in 1917
Railway stations in Great Britain opened in 1919
Railway stations served by Great Western Railway
1851 establishments in England